Sally Daley (born, October 24, 1941 – died, April 10, 2020) was an American church musician, organist and composer.

Daley was born in Allentown, Pennsylvania and studied music at Northwestern University in Evanston, Illinois. She served as a musician at various churches in the Chicago area and, since 2007, had been the music director at St. Mary Goretti Church in Schiller Park, Illinois. As a member of the Mu Phi Epsilon International Professional Music Fraternity, she twice received honorable mentions at their international composition competitions. Daley was also a member of the National Pastoral Musicians and the Creative Musicians Coalition and the Franciscan Order of the Queenship of Mary.

She was living in Illinois when she died.

References

   

1941 births
2020 deaths
Musicians from Allentown, Pennsylvania
Northwestern University alumni
American organists
American women composers